The 2019–20 Louisiana Ragin' Cajuns women's basketball team represents the University of Louisiana at Lafayette during the 2019–20 NCAA Division I women's basketball season. The Ragin' Cajuns are led by eighth-year head coach Garry Brodhead and play all home games at the Cajundome along with the Louisiana Ragin' Cajuns men's basketball team with the exception of their March 5 meeting with UT Arlington at Earl K. Long Gymnasium, the first basketball game to be held there since 2016. They are members in the Sun Belt Conference.

On March 12, the Sun Belt Conference cancelled the remainder of their women's and men's basketball tournaments due to rising threats of the COVID-19 pandemic.  The Cajuns were scheduled to play Troy in the upcoming weekend.  The Cajuns will finish the season ranked number four in the conference.

Previous season 
The Ragin' Cajuns finished the 2017–18 season 7-23, 5–13 in Sun Belt play to finish in tenth place in the conference. They made it to the 2018-19 Sun Belt Conference women's basketball tournament before losing to the South Alabama Jaguars 61–73 in the first-round game. The Ragin' Cajuns did not participate in any other post-season play.

Roster

Schedule and results

|-
!colspan=9 style=| Exhibition
|-

|-
!colspan=9 style=| Non-conference regular season

|-
!colspan=9 style=| Conference regular season

|-
!colspan=9 style=| Sun Belt Tournament

See also
 2019–20 Louisiana Ragin' Cajuns men's basketball team

References

Louisiana Ragin' Cajuns women's basketball seasons
Louisiana Ragin' Cajuns
Louisiana Ragin' Cajuns women's basketball